Batman and the Mad Monk is an American comic book limited series, featuring the DC Comics superhero Batman published in 2006–2007. It is set during the Batman: Year One continuity, but after the events of Batman and the Monster Men and before the events of Batman: The Man Who Laughs. It is the second part of Matt Wagner's two-part Dark Moon Rising series, which are expanded and modernized versions of Golden Age Batman stories.

Plot
Batman must counter sinister machinations and new dimensions of wickedness as he confronts the hooded menace of the Mad Monk, his first encounter with a supernatural villain. He also must deal with the direct repercussions of the events in Batman and the Monster Men.

References

2006 comics debuts
2007 comics endings
Comics by Matt Wagner